Athena & Robikerottsu (アテナ&ロビケロッツ, "Athena and Robocarrots") was a Hello! Project unit consisting of Niigaki Risa, Mitsui Aika, Nakajima Saki, and Okai Chisato.

Info 

This unit was formed in 2007 for the anime Robby and Kerobby, in which Niigaki voices a character.

In this group's original line up Tsuji Nozomi was supposed to be leader, but because of her maternity leave, Niigaki Risa joined the group instead.

The group disbanded in 2008.

Members 
 Niigaki Risa (新垣里沙; L)
 Mitsui Aika (光井愛佳)
 Nakajima Saki (中島早貴)
 Okai Chisato (岡井千聖)

Discography

Singles

Album Compilations 
 [2008.12.10] Hello! Project - Petit Best 9 (#10 Seishun! LOVE Lunch)
 [2008.12.10] Hello! Project - Hello! Project Special Unit Mega Best (#14 Shouri no BIG WAVE!!!)

Total Sales Count

External links 
 Athena & Robikerottsu discography 

Anime musical groups
Hello! Project groups
Japanese girl groups
Japanese idol groups
Japanese pop music groups
Musical groups from Tokyo
Musical groups established in 2007
2007 establishments in Japan
Musical groups disestablished in 2008
2008 disestablishments in Japan
Musical quartets